For God And Country, a book by James Yee, was published in 2005 by PublicAffairs. James Yee was a US Army Muslim chaplain serving in the Guantanamo Bay prison.
This book details his experiences both as a chaplain, and later as a detainee at the prison.

References

External links
After Words interview with Yee on For God and Country, January 14, 2006

2005 non-fiction books
Guantanamo Bay detention camp
War on Terror books
PublicAffairs books